The Guanshan Waterfront Park is a park in Guanshan Township, Taitung County, Taiwan.

History
The park was built in 1999 from the previous dumping ground.

Geology
The park spans over an area of 34 hectares. One-third of the park consists of a lake and the remaining two-thirds is the park area. The water for the lake comes from a subterranean river. The park consists of pavilions, nest boxes, ecological island etc.

Transportation
The park is accessible within walking distance southeast of Guanshan Station of Taiwan Railways.

See also
 List of parks in Taiwan
 Guanshan Riverside Park

References

External links

  

1999 establishments in Taiwan
Geography of Taitung County
Parks established in 1999
Parks in Taitung County
Tourist attractions in Taitung County